Epicrocis poliochyta is a species of snout moth in the genus Epicrocis. It was described by Turner in 1924, and is known from Australia.

References

Moths described in 1924
Phycitini
Endemic fauna of Australia